The 2000–01 season is Feyenoord's 93rd season of play, the club's 45th season in the Eredivisie and its 79th consecutive season in the top flight of Dutch football. It is the first season with new manager Bert van Marwijk who came over from Fortuna Sittard. Feyenoord entered the 2000–01 KNVB Cup in the third round (1/8 Final) and the 2000–01 UEFA Cup in the 1st round after being eliminated bij Sturm Graz in the 3rd Qualifying round of the UEFA Champions League.

Eredivisie

League table

Results by matchday

Matches
These are the matches scheduled for Feyenoord in the 2000-2001 Eredivisie season.

KNVB Cup

UEFA Champions League

Qualifying phase 

Third qualifying round

UEFA Cup

Player details

Appearances (Apps.) numbers are for appearances in competitive games only including sub appearances
Red card numbers denote:   Numbers in parentheses represent red cards overturned for wrongful dismissal.

Transfers

In:

Out:

Notes

References

Feyenoord seasons
Feyenoord